Thomas Arden (1508–1550) was Mayor of Faversham, Kent, England.

He was murdered by his wife, Alice, and her lover, Richard Moseby. This would inspire the Elizabethan play, Arden of Faversham, which in turn was the basis of the opera Arden Must Die (1967).

References

Further reading
 Raphael Holinshed's Chronicles

1508 births
1550 deaths
16th-century English politicians
Mayors of places in Kent